Bedřichov may refer to places in the Czech Republic:

Bedřichov (Blansko District), a municipality and village in the South Moravian Region
Bedřichov (Jablonec nad Nisou District), a municipality and village in the Liberec Region